The Vancouver Island Regional Correctional Centre (VIRCC) is a Regional Correctional Centre that is located in the District Municipality of Saanich, Vancouver Island, British Columbia, Canada. It lies within metropolitan Victoria, British Columbia, in its northwest suburbs. The centre offers grief counseling to the family members of prisoners' deceased victims. On October 26, 1977, approximately 20 inmates took a prison officer hostage with a knife, but released him peacefully the next day. A prison riot at Prince George Regional Correctional Centre on April 26, 1983 led to ten prisoners being transferred to VIRCC. A prison riot at VIRCC in January 1985 led to 37 prisoners appearing before a disciplinary review board. On March 26, 2005, five inmates were charged with mischief after having together caused between $40,000 and $50,000 worth of damage to a living unit at the centre. In September 2006, David Johnston, a homeless man imprisoned at the VIRCC due to repeated sleeping on Beacon Hill Park and St. Ann's Academy property, went on a hunger strike to fight for the right to sleep outdoors and was supported by other homeless people who created a tent city. On February 22, 2007, inmate Wayne Allan Turner was found dead in the centre, hanging from a fire sprinkler head. British Columbia Government and Service Employees' Union corrections and sheriff services component chairman Dean Purdy stated in March 2010 that there had been 63 assaults on the centre's guards by inmates since 2003 when the jail became overcrowded due to the closing of nine other British Columbia jails. An attempted prison escape by two prisoners was foiled in July 2011.

References

Prisons in British Columbia
Saanich, British Columbia